This is a list of wars involving the Kingdom of Thailand, its predecessor states, and by Siamese people, from antiquity to the present day. It also includes wars fought outside Thailand by Thailand military.

Sukhothai Kingdom

Ayutthaya Kingdom

Thonburi Kingdom

Rattanakosin Kingdom

After 1932 revolution

See also 
 Military history of Thailand

Notes

References 

 
Thailand
Wars
Wars